Nabiac is a small town on the Mid North Coast, New South Wales, Australia in Mid-Coast Council. It is north-west of Forster, and south of Taree.

Nabiac is the central town of the Wallamba Valley. As is typical of small North Coast towns, it developed in the second half of the 19th century as a small river port (later called Bullocks Wharf on the eastern edge of the town) for the hardwood-cutting (mainly Australian red cedar) trade. Later as the valley was cleared, small-scale dairying and corn-growing became dominant but its importance has since declined. At first, milk was mainly bought by the dairy at Dyers Crossing (about 6  km west of Nabiac). Later fresh milk was also supplied to the Sydney market via the Sydney Milk Board.

The first post office in the area was established in May 1870 on the south side of the Wallamba and was initially called "Cape Hawke Post Office" after Cape Hawke, which is 30  km away. It was renamed "Clarkson's Crossing" in February 1880 and Nabiac on 1 June 1894. The  Pacific Highway was relocated through Nabiac in the mid-1950s. This included the opening of a bridge over the Wallamba to replace Clarkson's Crossing on 15 November 1958. Since then Nabiac has steadily become more of a highway service town and tourist stopping point.

The poet Les Murray was born in Nabiac, although his family lived in nearby Bunyah. He travelled to school in Nabiac for his primary and early high school education.

References

External links

Nabiac Community site

Towns in the Hunter Region
Suburbs of Mid-Coast Council